The office of Lord Lieutenant of Merseyside was created on 1 April 1974, taking over some duties from the Lord Lieutenant of Lancashire and Lord Lieutenant of Cheshire. As Merseyside (north of the River Mersey) remains part of the Lancashire County Palatine, the Lord Lieutenant is appointed by the monarch in their capacity as Duke of Lancaster. The Lieutenancy area was created on the 1 April 1974, upon the creation of Merseyside itself.

Deputy Lieutenants
The county's current deputy lieutenants are:

|  style="text-align:left; width:33%; vertical-align:top;"|
Professor Denise Barrett-Baxendale, MBE
Sir Michael J. Bibby, Bt
Michael P. Braham, Esq
Zia U. Chaudry, Esq
Andrew J. Cooke, Esq, QPM
Captain Hugh B. Daglish, LVO, JP
Lady Marina Dalglish, MBE
The Rt Hon The Earl of Derby
Ms Claire F. Dove, OBE
Mrs Paige Earlam
Canon Ruth Fabby, MBE
Mr John Flamson, OBE
Mrs Judith L. Greensmith, CBE

|  style="text-align:left; width:33%; vertical-align:top;"|

Colonel Charles T. Hillock, RD
Dr Ruth Hussey, CB, OBE
Elaine Inglesbey-Burke, CBE
Dr Nicholas M. Jedynakiewicz
Nigel Lanceley
Stephen Maddox, OBE
Ms Lesley Martin-Wright, JP
Ian S. Meadows, Esq, OBE
Miss Anne P. Morris
Professor Sir Jonathan M. Murphy, QPM
Professor Sir Howard J. Newby, CBE
Robert T.H. Owen, Esq, JP
Dr Roger N. Phillips

|  style="text-align:left; width:33%; vertical-align:top;"|

Professor Gerald M. Pillay, FRSA
His Honour John Roberts
Mrs Rebecca Ross-Williams 
David Steer, Esq, QC
Mr Max Steinberg, CBE
Professor Ian G. Tracey
Colonel Mark C.H. Underhill, OBE
Nicholas A. Wainwright, MBE
Professor Nigel Weatherill
Mr Allan D. Williams, MVO
Brian Wong, Esq, JP
Peter D. Woods, Esq
Mr Stephen Yip, MBE

Former
Former Deputy Lieutenants have included:

Brigadier The Lord Selwyn-Lloyd, CH, CBE, TD, QC
Lieutenant-Colonel and Brevet Colonel Alan S. Eccles, MBE, TD, JP
Lieutenant-Colonel Charles H. Elston, TD
Major Henry B. Chrimes
Air Commodore Jack Broughton, OBE
Richard A. Foster
William D. Fulton, Esq., JP
Professor Philip N. Love, CBE
Mr Harry Rimmer, CBE
Sir James Sharples, QPM
Anthony W. Shone, Esq.
Colonel Martin G.C. Amlôt, OBE, OStJ
Mrs Angela A. Jones, OBE
Dr John E. Roberts, CBE, QC
Mr John N. Rushbrooke, JP
Miss Pauline L. Burrows
Mr Alan J. Chick, Esq., JP
Sir David C. Clarke
Frank Field, Baron Field of Birkenhead
John R. Flamson
Stephen B. L. Yip, MBE
Wally Brown, Esq., CBE
Professor Michael Brown, CBE]
James C.M. Davies, Esq, OBE
Professor Sir Ian Gilmore
Professor Sir Mark Hedley
Roger Morris, Esq, OBE
Edward Perry, Esq
Mrs Abila Pointing, MBE

References

External links
 The Lord Lieutenant of Merseyside

Merseyside
Merseyside
Lord-Lieutenants of Merseyside
1974 establishments in England